Captain Augustus M. Reinhardt (1842–1923) was the namesake of Reinhardt University in Waleska, Georgia and a founder of Atlanta's Gate City Street Railroad Company. He was a Confederate war veteran, and had been a lawyer, city councilman and mayor pro tem.

References

Businesspeople from Atlanta
1842 births
1943 deaths
Atlanta City Council members
Reinhardt University
Waleska, Georgia